(Don Quixote at Camacho's Wedding), TVWV 21:32, is a one-act comic serenata by Georg Philipp Telemann. The libretto by the student poet Daniel Schiebeler is based on chapter 20 of volume 2 of Cervantes's novel Don Quixote. The opera premiered on 5 November 1761 in Hamburg.

History 
Miguel de Cervantes's novel "El ingenioso hidalgo Don Quijote de la Mancha", published in 1605 and 1615, is part of mainstream World literature. The scene of the hero and his squire taking part in the wedding of Camacho was chosen by the poet Daniel Schiebeler (1741–1771) when he was a student aged 18 for the libretto of a Singspiel, entitled Basilio und Quiteria, which he offered to the composer Georg Philipp Telemann, around 60 years his senior. Telemann was agreeable, but made substantial changes to the text.

The opera premiered on 5 November 1761, when Telemann was 80 years old, in a concert hall in Hamburg.

Roles 
 Don Quichotte, a knight (bass)
 Sancho Pansa, his squire (bass)
 Pedrillo, a shepherd (soprano)
 Grisostomo, a shepherd (soprano)
 Quiteria, the bride (soprano)
 Comacho, the bridegroom (alto)
 Basilio, a shepherd (tenor)
 Choir of shepherds (SATB)

Music 
Telemann uses the story's occasions for humorous effects, including elements from the opera seria, to characterize the noble people, as well as folk music for the peasants. Sancho Pansa is wittily portrayed, for example by "athletic leaps" in his recollection of earlier episode. The choruses often take instrumental and rhythmic ideas from Spanish folk music. A reviewer notes:

Recording and performance 
The opera was recorded in 1994 by the Bremen vocal ensemble for ancient music La Stagione, conducted by Michael Schneider, with Raimund Nolte as Don Quichotte, Michael Schopper as Sancho Pansa, Silke Stapf as Pedrillo and Mechthild Bach as Grisostomo, among others.

The opera was performed again on stage in Magdeburg, where Telemann's operas have been revived from 1929. It was played at the 16th Magdeburger Telemann-Festtage in March 2002, for the first time after almost 250 years. It was performed again in 2006 by the Magdeburg Opera. It was repeated in 2012 as part of the project Telemann für Schüler (Telemann for students), at schools and halls of Magdeburg. It was performed by the Ensemble Barock vokal of the Hochschule für Musik Mainz and the Neumeyer Consort, conducted by Felix Koch.

Notes

References

Bibliography

External links 
 Libretto deutsche-digitale-bibliothek.de
 Bernd Baselt (ed.): Don Quichotte auf der Hochzeit des Comacho: Comic opera-serenata in one act (score) A-R Editions 1991

German-language operas
1761 operas
Operas by Georg Philipp Telemann
Operas
One-act operas
Operas based on Don Quixote
Opera world premieres at the Hamburg State Opera